Wang Jinlong (born March 1963) is a Chinese scientist and educator in the fields of shortwave communication. He has been President of the PLA Ground Force Engineering University since September 2015, and formerly served as Vice-President of PLA Information Engineering University. He holds the rank of major general (shao jiang) in the People's Liberation Army (PLA).

Education
Wang was born in Haixing County, Hebei in March 1963. He received his doctor's degree from PLA Information Engineering University in 1992.

Career
In January 2012 he was appointed Vice-President of PLA Information Engineering University. On September 25, 2015, he was promoted to become President of the PLA University of Science and Technology (now PLA Ground Force Engineering University), replacing Zhang Yafei.

In September 2017 he became a delegate to the 19th National Congress of the Communist Party of China.

Honours and awards
 November 22, 2019 Member of the Chinese Academy of Sciences (CAS)

References

1963 births
Living people
People from Haixing County
PLA Information Engineering University alumni
People's Liberation Army generals from Hebei
Members of the Chinese Academy of Sciences